Francesco Negri may refer to:

 Francesco Negri (Antitrinitarian) (1500–1563), Italian ex-Benedictine monk in Poland
 Francesco Negri (travel writer) (1623–1698), Italian priest traveller in Scandinavia
 Francesco Negri (photographer) (1841–1924), mayor of Casale Monferrato and lawyer
 Francesco Negri (composer), 17th-century Italian composer